The Uganda Standard Gauge Railway is a planned railway system linking the country to the neighboring countries of Kenya, Rwanda, Democratic Republic of the Congo and South Sudan, as part of East African Railway Master Plan. The new Standard Gauge Railway (SGR), is intended to replace the old, inefficient metre-gauge railway system.

Location
The railway system would consist of four major sections:
 Malaba–Kampala Section
Also referred as the Eastern Line, would stretch from the border with Kenya at Malaba, through Tororo and Jinja, to end at Kampala, the capital and largest city in Uganda.

 Tororo–Gulu Section
From Gulu, one spur will continue north to Elegu and on to Nimule and Juba in South Sudan.

 Kampala–Mpondwe Section 
This is referred to as the Western Line.

 Bihanga–Mirama Hills Section 
This is also referred to as the Southwestern Line.

Overview
This 1435 mm (4 ft  in) railway line is intended to ease the transfer of goods between the port of Mombasa and the city of Kampala, and subsequently to Kigali in Rwanda, and to Beni in the Democratic Republic of the Congo and to Nimule and Juba in South Sudan.  Goods would travel from Mombasa along the Kenya Standard Gauge Railway to Malaba, at the border with Uganda, and transfer on to this railway system.

In April 2017, preliminary estimates for the entire Uganda SGR Project were quoted at USh 45.6 trillion (approximately US$12.8 billion).

In March 2019, during a state visit to Kenya, President Yoweri Museveni of Uganda and his host, President Uhuru Kenyatta of Kenya, jointly, publicly committed to extend the Standard Gauge Railway (SGR) to Kampala via Malaba.

Construction
The construction, is expected to be financed by the government of Uganda, using borrowed money from the Exim Bank of China. However, the loan cannot be approved by the lender until Kenya finalizes the funding arrangement for the Naivasha–Kisumu–Malaba section of its SGR. Once funding is secured, the construction of the Eastern Line is expected to last 42 months. The entire  SGR in Uganda will cost an estimated  $12.8 billion.

In May 2018, The EastAfrican reported that Uganda may scale back on starting major infrastructure projects, in an effort to reduce its fiscal deficit in the run-up to joining the East African Monetary Union in 2024. One of the requirements for joining the EAC monetary union is that a partner state maintains a fiscal deficit of not more than 3 per cent of GDP, for three consecutive years prior to joining the monetary union. The SGR project may be one of those delayed or scaled back.

In December 2020, the EastAfrican reported that the government of Uganda would start construction of its SGR in the 2022/2023 financial year, with the expectation that Kenya would have figured out how to fund the Naivasha to Malaba section when the Uganda SGR reaches Malaba, "by the end of the projected construction period".

See also
 Standard-gauge railway
 Isaka–Kigali Standard Gauge Railway
 Rwanda Standard Gauge Railway

References

External links
About Uganda Standard Gauge Railway, including Maps, Diagrams and Video
Uganda military to train standard gauge railway construction engineers
East African leaders push for quick deal on SGR As of 26 June 2018.

U
U
International railway lines
Railway lines in Uganda
Government-owned companies of Uganda
Transport in Uganda